"I'm Amazed" is a single by My Morning Jacket off their album Evil Urges, released in 2008. The song was #8 on Rolling Stones list of the 100 Best Songs of 2008.  It is also one of their most successful singles to date, having a higher peak on the adult album alternative chart. They performed this song along with "Evil Urges" on Saturday Night Live on May 10, 2008.

Track listing

Charts

References

2008 singles
My Morning Jacket songs
2007 songs
Rough Trade Records singles
Songs written by Jim James
Song recordings produced by Joe Chiccarelli